A referendum on allowing President Lukashenko to stand in further elections was held in Belarus on 17 October 2004, alongside parliamentary elections. Lukashenko was nearing the end of his constitutionally-limited two terms, and the change would allow him to run for a third term. 

In accordance with article 140 of the constitution, a majority of valid votes as well as a majority of registered voters in favor of the constitutional changes were required for the result to be deemed valid

The result was 88.91% of valid votes and 79.42% of registered voters in favor, with a turnout of 90.28%.

Results

Controversy
Paragraph 112 of Belarusian Electoral Code lists "questions connected with election and dismissal of the President of the Republic of Belarus" among questions prohibited from being brought out to the Republican referendum. There were several arrests of protesters against the result and reports of oppositional leaders being beaten by police.

References

External links
Official 2004 Belarus Rederendum data

Constitutional amendments
Referendums in Belarus
2004 referendums
2004 in Belarus
Constitutional referendums in Belarus
October 2004 events in Europe